Madeleine Blais (born 1946) is an American journalist, author and professor in the University of Massachusetts Amherst's journalism department. As a reporter for the Miami Herald, Blais earned the Pulitzer Prize for Feature Writing in 1980 for "Zepp's Last Stand", a story about a self-declared pacifist and subsequently dishonorably discharged World War I veteran. Blais has worked at The Boston Globe (1971–1972), The Trenton Times (1974–1976) and the Miami Herald (1979–1987). She has also published articles in The Washington Post, the Chicago Tribune, the Northeast Magazine in the Hartford Courant, The Philadelphia Inquirer, Newsday, Nieman Reports, the Detroit Free Press and the San Jose Mercury News. She is from Amherst, Massachusetts.

Personal life
She graduated from the College of New Rochelle in 1969. While there, she roomed with Mercedes Ruehl and Suzanne Hampton. She is married to author John Katzenbach.

Works

In These Girls, Hope Is a Muscle, Atlantic Monthly Press, 1995,

References

1946 births
Katzenbach family
College of New Rochelle alumni
Blaise, Madeleine
University of Massachusetts Amherst faculty
Living people
20th-century American journalists
People from Amherst, Massachusetts
People from Granby, Massachusetts